Joseph Mercer, OBE (9 August 1914 – 9 August 1990) was an English football player and manager. Mercer, who played as a defender for Everton and Arsenal in his footballing career, also went on to manage Aston Villa, Manchester City and England.

Playing career
Mercer was born in Ellesmere Port, Cheshire, the son of a former Nottingham Forest and Tranmere Rovers footballer, also named Joe. Joe Mercer Sr. died following health problems resulting from a gas attack during the Great War when his son was only 12.

Mercer, a left-half, first played for Ellesmere Port Town. He was a powerful tackler and good at anticipating an opponent's moves. He joined Everton in September 1932 at the age of 18 and claimed a regular first team place in the 1935–36 season. Mercer made 186 appearances for Everton, scoring two goals and a winning a League Championship medal in the 1938–39 season. While playing for Everton he gained five England caps between 1938 and 1939.

Like many players of his generation, Mercer lost out on seven seasons of football due to the Second World War. He became a sergeant-major and played in 26 wartime internationals, many of them as captain. The Everton manager Theo Kelly accused Mercer of not trying in an international against Scotland (when?) but in reality Mercer had sustained a severe cartilage injury. Even after consulting an orthopaedic specialist, the Everton management refused to believe him and Mercer had to pay for the surgery himself. During the war Mercer guested for Chester City, making his debut in a 4–1 win over Halifax Town in September 1942.

Mercer moved in late 1946 for £9,000 (2022: £471,362) to Arsenal, commuting from Liverpool; Theo Kelly brought Mercer's boots to the transfer negotiations to prevent Mercer having a reason to go back to say goodbye to the other players at Everton. He made his Arsenal debut against Bolton Wanderers on 30 November 1946 and soon after joining Arsenal, Mercer became club captain. As captain, he led Arsenal through their period of success in the late 1940s and early 1950s, helping to haul his side from the lower end of the table to win a League Championship title in 1947–48.

Mercer went on to win an FA Cup winner's medal in 1950 and was voted FWA Footballer of the Year the same year. He led Arsenal to Cup final in 1952, which they lost 1–0 to Newcastle United, but the following year bounced back to win his third League title with Arsenal winning the 1952–53 League Championship on goal average. Mercer initially decided to retire in May 1953, but soon recanted and returned to Arsenal for the 1953–54 season. However, he broke his leg in two places after a collision with teammate Joe Wade in a match against Liverpool on 10 April 1954, and finally called time on his footballing career the year after. Mercer played 275 times for Arsenal in all, scoring two goals.

Managerial career
After his playing career ended Mercer spent a little over a year working as a journalist and a grocer. His wife's family had encouraged him to become involved in grocery during his time at Everton and, while still Arsenal's captain, he ran his grocery business from 105 to 107 Brighton Street, Wallasey.

On 18 August 1955, he returned to football, becoming manager of Sheffield United two days before their first game of the season against Newcastle United. Mercer was appointed to replace manager Reg Freeman who had died during the close season. As a manager, he began inauspiciously and his first season ended in relegation. 

The rest of his time as manager was spent in the Second Division and in December 1958, wanting to move to another club, he resigned and moved to Aston Villa who were bottom of the First Division. Although he led them to the FA Cup semi-finals he was relegated to Division Two for a second time. He moulded a talented young side at Villa and his team became known as the 'Mercer Minors'. He led Villa to victory in the inaugural League Cup in 1961 but suffered a stroke in 1964, and was then sacked by the Aston Villa board upon his recovery.

Despite this, his health improved and he went on to enjoy great success as a manager with Manchester City between 1965 and 1971. In his first season at Maine Road, the club won the 1966 Second Division title to regain top-flight status. Two seasons later Mercer led Manchester City to the 1967–68 First Division championship, and went on to win the 1969 FA Cup, the 1970 League Cup, and the 1970 European Cup Winners' Cup.

In 1970–71, Mercer had a dispute with his assistant Malcolm Allison, after the two men became embroiled in Manchester City's takeover battle. Mercer supported the existing board, led by the respected Albert Alexander, while Allison supported the rival group led by Peter Swales after being promised that he would be manager in his own right.

The takeover succeeded, and Mercer was shocked to discover that his car parking space and office were removed. This led to Mercer moving upstairs to become general manager at Manchester City in October 1971, with Allison taking over as team manager. Mercer left Manchester City at the end of the season and became manager of Coventry City, whom he managed from 1972 to 1974. During the same time Mercer was also caretaker manager of the England national football team for a brief period in 1974 after Sir Alf Ramsey's resignation. During his time in charge England won the 1974 British Home Championship title which was shared with Scotland. In total Mercer was in charge for seven games, winning three of them, drawing another three and losing one. The FA was so impressed by these performances that questions arose about the possibility of Mercer taking the job on a longer-term basis, with, as an assistant, his Coventry City protege Gordon Milne. Mercer, too, seemed open to persuasion but the FA was working on another plan, putting out feelers to the most successful English club manager available, Leeds United's Don Revie.

Later life

After quitting as Coventry City boss, he served as a director of the club from 1975 to his retirement in 1981. He was made an Officer of the Order of the British Empire for services to football in 1976. He suffered with Alzheimer's disease in later life and died, sitting in his favourite armchair, on his 76th birthday in 1990. He was survived by his widow Norah, who remained a keen football follower, and attended Manchester City matches to support City for many years. She died in March 2013 and her funeral was attended by 120-plus mourners, including City legends Mike Summerbee, Tony Book, Colin Bell and Joe Corrigan as well as Sir Bobby Charlton.

He is commemorated by his old club Manchester City with the road Joe Mercer Way at the City of Manchester Stadium being named after him. On the road there are two mosaics by renowned Manchester artist Mark Kennedy of Mercer; one shows his smiling face lifting the League Championship trophy; the other is a version of a famous photograph showing the back of him as he looks out over the Maine Road pitch towards the Kippax Stand. His contribution to City was commemorated in the Kippax tribute still sung at the Etihad Stadium to the tune of Auld Lang Syne: "The Stretford End cried out aloud: 'It's the end of you Sky Blues.' Joe Mercer came. We played the game. We went to Rotherham United, we won 1–0 and we were back into Division One. We've won the League, we've won the Cup, we've been to Europe too. And when we win the League again we'll sing this song to you: City, City, City."

At Maine Road a corporate suite, the Joe Mercer Suite, was officially opened by his widow Norah in 1993. A similar facility named after him exists at Goodison. In 1993 Mercer's official biography, Football with a Smile, was written by Gary James. This book sold out within six months and was revised and re-published early in 2010.

Joe Mercer is also featured upon the mural that surrounds the Emirates Stadium.

He was a subject of the television programme This Is Your Life in March 1970 when he was surprised by Eamonn Andrews.

Mercer was inducted into the English Football Hall of Fame at the National Football Museum in Preston on 4 July 2009. He was inducted for his managerial success. Mercer was an active freemason attending Rivacre Lodge No. 5805 at Ellesmere Port.

Honours

As a player 
Everton
First Division: 1938–39

Arsenal
First Division: 1947–48, 1952–53
FA Charity Shield: 1948, 1953
FA Cup: 1950
FA Cup runner-up: 1952

As a manager 
Aston Villa
Second Division: 1959–60
Football League Cup: 1960–61

Manchester City
First Division: 1967–68
FA Cup: 1968–69
Football League Cup: 1969–70
European Cup Winners' Cup: 1969–70
FA Charity Shield: 1968
FA Charity Shield runner-up: 1969
Second Division: 1965–66

England
British Home Championship: 1973–74 (Shared)

Individual
English Football Hall of Fame: 2009
FWA Footballer of the Year: 1949–50

Managerial statistics

See also 
 List of English football championship winning managers

References

Bibliography

External links
 
 

1914 births
People from Ellesmere Port
English footballers
England international footballers
England wartime international footballers
English Football Hall of Fame inductees
Ellesmere Port Town F.C. players
Everton F.C. players
Arsenal F.C. players
Chester City F.C. wartime guest players
Reading F.C. wartime guest players
Aldershot F.C. wartime guest players
English football managers
England national football team managers
Sheffield United F.C. managers
Aston Villa F.C. managers
Manchester City F.C. managers
Coventry City F.C. managers
English Football League players
Royal Army Physical Training Corps soldiers
British Army personnel of World War II
Military personnel from Cheshire
Officers of the Order of the British Empire
1990 deaths
English Football League representative players
Sportspeople from Cheshire
Association football wing halves
Freemasons of the United Grand Lodge of England
FA Cup Final players